Aryo Puspito Setyaki Djojohadikusumo (born 25 April 1983) is an Indonesian politician of Gerindra party who served as a member of the People's Representative Council between 2014 and 2019.

Early life and family
Aryo Puspito Setyaki Djojohadikusumo was born in Jakarta on 25 April 1983, the first child of Hashim Djojohadikusumo. He studied business at the University of Durham, and had before taken a semester studying archaeology. In total, he spent 12 years studying in the United Kingdom.

He married Sachi Sophia in August 2018.

Career
After graduating from university, Aryo founded a company in 2007 with some friends, and became its CEO. The company operated in various fields, but by 2008 Aryo and his friends joined his father's company which was expanding in Indonesia. He became a commissioner at Hashim's Arsari Group.

Outside of business, Aryo also joined the newly-established Gerindra, which was founded in 2008 by his father and his uncle Prabowo Subianto, becoming the chairman of its youth wing - though not formally so until 2011. In 2012, he was also appointed as one of the party's deputy secretary generals.

Legislature
Aryo ran in the 2014 Indonesian legislative election from Jakarta's 3rd electoral district. He won 53,268 votes and secured a seat at the People's Representative Council. He became a member of the body's seventh commission on Energy, Research and Technology, and the Environment.

During Joko Widodo's presidency, he criticized the appointment of Badrodin Haiti as police chief in 2015, saying that it damaged the fight against corruption. In 2016, he also criticized the Provincial Government of Jakarta under Basuki Tjahaja Purnama for removing property tax, noting that the removal of the revenue source would jeopardize funding for other projects and commenting that the move was made for political reasons.

Aryo also became part of a special committee assessing the creation of an alcohol ban. He did not run for reelection in 2019.

External links

References

1983 births
Living people
Politicians from Jakarta
Members of the People's Representative Council, 2014
Great Indonesia Movement Party politicians
Alumni of Durham University
Djojohadikusumo family